Hibiscus genevii is a species of flowering plant in the Malvaceae family. It is known locally as mandrinette and is endemic to the island of Mauritius.

It is one of four species of Hibiscus that are indigenous to the Mascarene islands (Mauritius, Reunion, Rodrigues), and is most closely related to Hibiscus liliiflorus of Rodrigues and Hibiscus fragilis. 
It was thought to be extinct for over a century, but was rediscovered in 1968.

References

genevii
Endemic flora of Mauritius
Taxa named by William Jackson Hooker
Taxa named by Wenceslas Bojer